The 2015 Purdue Boilermakers football team was an American football team that represented Purdue University during the 2015 NCAA Division I FBS football season. The Boilermakers competed in the West Division of the Big Ten Conference and played their home games at Ross–Ade Stadium in West Lafayette, Indiana. The team was led by head coach Darrell Hazell, who was in his third season at Purdue.

Purdue finished the season 2–10, 1–7 in Big Ten play, to finish in last place in the West Division.

Preseason
In 2014, Purdue compiled a 3–9 record, 1–7 in Big Ten play, to finish in last place in the West Division. As a result of their poor record, Purdue was not bowl eligible for the second consecutive year. Their only conference win came against Illinois. The 2014 season marked the first time since 1993 that Purdue finished with the worst record in the Big Ten in back-to-back seasons.

On January 20, 2015, wide receivers coach Kevin Sherman left the program for the same position at Pittsburgh. As a result, Purdue hired Terry Malone to be the news tight ends coach, moving former tight ends coach Gerad Parker to wide receivers coach.

Recruiting

Position key

Recruits
Purdue's recruiting class consisted a total of 26 recruits.

Schedule
Purdue announced their 2015 football schedule on June 3, 2013. The 2015 schedule consist of 7 home and 5 away games in the regular season. The Boilermakers will host Big Ten foes Illinois, Indiana, Minnesota, and Nebraska and will travel to Iowa, Michigan State, Northwestern, and Wisconsin.

The Boilermakers hosted three of their four non conference games against Bowling Green, Indiana State and Virginia Tech. Purdue traveled to Huntington, West Virginia to face Marshall of the Conference USA on September 6.

Originally Purdue had Notre Dame scheduled instead of Virginia Tech, but due to scheduling conflicts the Hokies were scheduled instead of the Fighting Irish.

Schedule Source:

Radio
Radio coverage for all games was broadcast statewide on The Purdue Sports Network and on Sirius XM Satellite Radio. The radio announcers were Tim Newton with play-by-play, Pete Quinn with color commentary, and Kelly Kitchel with sideline reports.

Game summaries

at Marshall

Sources:

    
    
    
    
    
    
    
    
    
    
    

To open the season, Purdue faced the Marshall Thundering Herd.

Indiana

Roster

Awards and honors

2016 NFL Draft

References

Purdue
Purdue Boilermakers football seasons
Purdue Boilermakers football